Gwangju Mudeung Baseball Stadium is a baseball stadium in Gwangju, South Korea. It is used mostly for baseball games and was the home stadium of Kia Tigers, formerly the Haitai Tigers, between 1982 and 2013.

See also 
Gwangju Mudeung Stadium
 

Baseball venues in South Korea
Sports venues in Gwangju
Kia Tigers
Buildings and structures in Gwangju
Sports venues completed in 1965